Sinmindang, literally the New People's Party, may refer to:

Korea 
 New People's Party (Korea) (1946)

South Korea 
 New Democratic Party (South Korea) (1967–1980)
 New Korea Democratic Party (1985–1988), informally known as Sinmindang
 New United Democratic Party (1991), informally known as Sinmindang

See also 
 Liberalism in South Korea
 Conservatism in South Korea
 Jinbodang (disambiguation)
 Minjudang (disambiguation)
 Nodongdang (disambiguation)